The President of the Court of Appeal of the Bahamas heads the Court of Appeal of the Bahamas.

Legal basis
The position of President of the Court of Appeal is authorised by Article 98(2)(a) of the Constitution of the Bahamas. Under Article 98(2)(b), the President may invite the Chief Justice to sit in the Court of Appeal. Under Article 99(1), the Governor-General appoints the President on the recommendation of the Prime Minister after consultation with the Leader of the Opposition. Article 102(6) governs removal of the President; the Prime Minister recommends removal to the Governor-General, who then forms a tribunal of at least three members selected by the Governor-General in accordance with the advice of the Prime Minister.

List of presidents
 Hon. Sir Ronald O. Sinclair, 1965 to 1970
 Hon. Sir Paget Bourke, 1970 to 1975
 Hon. Sir Michael Hogan, 1975 to 1978
 Hon. Sir Alastair Blair-Kerr, 1978 to 1982
 Hon. Kenneth Henry, 1987 to 1992
 Hon. Vincent C. Meville, 1992 to 1995
 Hon. J. C. Gonsalves-Sabola, 1 January 1996 to 2 October 1999
 Hon. Boyd Carey, 3 October 1999 to 31 December 1999
 Hon. Kenneth George, 1 January 2000 to 11 March 2000
 Rt Hon. Edward Zacca, 27 March 2000 to 27 July 2001
 Rt Hon. Dame Joan Sawyer, 4 September 2001 to 26 November 2010
 Hon. Dame Anita Allen, 30 November 2010 to present

References